Khalil Boukedjane (born January 27, 1981 in El Biar) is a former Algerian footballer.

Club career
In June 2005, Boukedjane joined CR Belouizdad.

Honours
 Won the Algerian Cup once with CR Belouizdad in 2009

References

External links
 DZFoot Profile
 

1981 births
Algerian footballers
Living people
Algerian Ligue Professionnelle 1 players
RC Kouba players
CR Belouizdad players
People from El Biar
Association football defenders
21st-century Algerian people